Neolicaphrium is an extinct genus of ungulate mammal belonging to the extinct order Litopterna. This animal lived from the Late Pliocene (Chapadmalalan) to the Late Pleistocene (Lujanian) in southern South America, being the last survivor of the family Proterotheriidae.

Species 

The genus includes two species, the type species N. recens and N. major. The fossil found of N. major, one jaw, come from the Miramar Formation in Chapadmalal, Argentina and correspond to the Chapadmalalan mammal age of South America (4.0 to 3.0 million years ago, in the Pliocene). N. recens appeared in the Ensenadan age (1.2-0.8 million years ago) and the species survived until the Lujanian age (800,000 and 11,000 years ago). Fossils of this species have been found in the Argentine provinces of the northeast, in Córdoba, Corrientes, Tezzanos Pinto Formation, Santa Fe and Santiago del Estero, in the southern Brazilian state of Rio Grande do Sul and the Sopas Formation of the Salto Department in Uruguay. N. recens is known from a partial skull, partial jaws, teeth and bones of the ankle and the forefeet. A fragmentary humerus, previously assigned to the doubtful species "Proterotherium berroi", could also be referred to this species.

Description 

Neolicaphrium was a proterotherid of small (N. recens) to medium (N. major) size. N. recens, weighing about 37 kilograms was one third smaller than N. major. In general terms, Neolicaphrium resembled Thoatherium of the Miocene, one of the most famous proterotherids, by its relatively graceful built adapted to a cursorial locomotion, although without presenting the extreme monodactyly that characterizes Thoatherium, so that still retained its three fingers in each hand and foot. Similar to the smaller deer of today, such as the pudus, the pampas deer and the muntjac, Neolicaphrium was a browsing herbivore. The isotopic analysis of the fossils indicates that Neolicaphrium fed mainly on fruits and to a lesser extent on terrestrial plants that grew at ground level, and that leaves were only a very limited part of their diet.

The composition of the fauna of the Sopas Formation in Uruguay, where fossils of N. recens from the late Pleistocene have been found, indicates that Neolicaphrium was a resident of savannahs and open tree forests. The rocks of the Sopas Formation were deposited in a gallery forest with rivers and Neolicaphrium lived there along with other mammals such as tapirs, the white-lipped peccary, the prehensile tail porcupine Coendou magnus, the capybara, the jaguar and the otter, species that characterize the tropical forest areas of South America.

Classification 
The genus Neolicaphrium was first described in 1921 by Frenguelli, based on incomplete remains found in Argentina. The type species, Neolicaphrium recens, is typical of Upper Pliocene - Upper Pleistocene deposits of Argentina, Uruguay and Brazil, while the species N. major was found in Pliocene soils of Argentina.

Neolicaphrium is the last of the proterotheres,  a group of litoptern mammals with shapes similar to equids, particularly with regard to leg structure. Neolicaphrium, in any case, was not the most specialized proterothere.

Extinction 
Previously it was thought that the family Proterotheriidae became extinct during the Pliocene, as a consequence of the climatic changes that occurred in the transition to the Pleistocene, along with the  pachyrukhine notoungulates and the argyrolagid metatherians. The fossil record of N. recens however, showed that this group survived until the late Pleistocene in forest areas, outside the typical Pampa regions of the Southern Cone that were predominant during the Quaternary ice ages; However, this idea was rejected until the 21st century, when the new fossil finds allowed to corroborate its presence in the Pleistocene. In the Sopas Formation have been found also fossils of several types of deer (Pampas deer and an extinct form). Neolicaphrium therefore coexisted throughout the Pleistocene with ungulate mammals of holarctic origin. Both competition with these animals, which reached South America during the Great American Biotic Interchange, and the environmental changes occurring since the end of the Miocene, which led to the disappearance of forest areas, may have contributed the decline and extinction of proterotherids.

Gallery

References

Bibliography 

 
 

Proterotheriids
Pleistocene mammals of South America
Pliocene mammals of South America
Piacenzian first appearances
Holocene extinctions
Ensenadan
Lujanian
Uquian
Chapadmalalan
Neogene Argentina
Pleistocene Argentina
Fossils of Argentina
Pleistocene Brazil
Fossils of Brazil
Pleistocene Uruguay
Fossils of Uruguay
Fossil taxa described in 1921
Prehistoric placental genera